Mako is a steel roller coaster located at SeaWorld Orlando in Orlando, Florida, United States. Manufactured by Bolliger & Mabillard, the hypercoaster model opened to the public on June 10, 2016. Mako is named after the mako shark and is located in the Sea of Mystery section of the park.

The roller coaster was marketed as the tallest, fastest, and longest roller coaster in Orlando and has been well-received, ranking every year since its opening in the top 50 of the annual Golden Ticket Awards publication from Amusement Today. It attained its highest ranking of 15 in 2019. The ride is one of six roller coasters at SeaWorld Orlando and was the first since Manta opened in 2009.

History
In April 2015, SeaWorld officials began teasing an upcoming announcement of a new thrill ride for their flagship park in Orlando, Florida. At the time, the only detail revealed was that the roller coaster would be 200 feet in height and would become the longest, tallest, and fastest roller coaster in the city. A month later on May 13, 2015, SeaWorld filed a trademark with the United States Patent and Trademark Office for the name "Mako" along with "Reef Hunter". On May 27, 2015, SeaWorld officially announced the construction of Mako, which was named after the mako shark. The mako has been identified as the fastest species of shark in the ocean. During the time of announcement, a simulated point-of-view shot was released depicting the ride's intended route along the park's lagoon.

On August 17, 2015, the first pieces of track began to ship from Ohio to Orlando, and started to arrive on site two days later. On January 6, 2016, the roller coaster's lift hill was topped-out. The first car of the train was shipped and revealed on February 16, 2016, with the car design exhibiting the face of a mako shark. On March 15, 2016, the last piece of track was put into place.

In April 2016, SeaWorld began showing a presentation called "Mako Rising" previewing the upcoming roller coaster in their Nautilis Theater, and later testing began on the ride with the park releasing an on-ride POV. Mako's soft opening was on June 2, 2016, with the official media day to introduce the roller coaster being hosted on June 9, 2016. A day after, its official opening to the public was on June 10, 2016. In addition to the ride's opening, a summer-dedicated event named "Summer of Mako" was hosted from June to August 2016 throughout the park and its sister water-park Aquatica Orlando.

Ride experience

Entrance and queue area 
The roller coaster is themed to the mako shark. Similarly the 2-acre (0.81 ha) park area around it, entitled "Shark Wreck Reef", is themed to sharks. The area features recycled art, a mural created by Guy Harvey, and educational pieces about human and shark interactions.

As guests go through the queue area, various educational displays and an additional Guy Harvey exhibit can be seen. The queue of the ride consists of a wooden pier, where the riders are situated under while waiting. During the queue, guests take on the point of view of a mako shark as it traverses through preying grounds. The theme of Mako's station is a shipwreck. Different sections of an original musical score is played throughout the queue and loading station, as well as the plaza area beneath the coaster's climactic loop. SeaWorld commissioned the 32-minute score, which was composed and produced by Rick McKee. Before the ride's train dispatches, a panel located above the riders shows scenes of shadowy figures consisting of a group of sharks migrating forward with accommodating visuals and sound.

Layout 
After leaving the station, the train makes a small right turn to a 200-foot (61 m) lift hill (which is right next to Kraken's dive loop) to begin its ascent. After reaching the top, it enters a 200-foot (61 m) drop, in which the train reaches at a top speed of 73 miles per hour (117 km/h). Then, the train makes a tall, overbanked turn, hugging the side of the lake, before an airtime hill. After the hill, the track reverses direction via a Hammerhead turn. Traveling over another camelback hill, there is a series of airtime hills as the track travels back along the lake before hitting the mid-course brake run. Off the mid-course brakes, the track makes a small left turn under the lift hill and goes into another airtime hill. After it makes a banked turn to the right, the track goes into another banked turn to the left over a part of the park's lagoon and then hits the final brake run.

Characteristics

Track 

The track pieces were shipped on flatbed trucks from Clermont Steel Fabricators in Batavia, Ohio to Orlando, Florida where they were assembled. The track of the roller coaster is purple with the supports colored blue. The roller coaster was designed to have nine airtime moments and a third of the layout traverses over water.

Trains 
Mako operates with lead and fiberglass trains each containing seven cars. Every seat has its own lap bar restraint and each car seats four riders in a single row for a total of 28 riders per train. The trains were designed with the physiology of a mako with gills on either side of the train, and feature polyurethane wheels that help to reduce friction on the track. They were manufactured by Bolliger & Mabillard in Switzerland.

Reception 

Mako has been positively received among guests and critics. Dewayne Bevil from the Orlando Sentinel described the ride as "breathtaking" and stated "SeaWorld has delivered on its marketing promise with the fastest, tallest, longest coaster in the Orlando market". Marjie Lambert from the Miami Herald commented that the ride was like a "retro coaster" and mentioned "its design is reminiscent of old wooden coasters where the track couldn’t be shaped into the pretzels and upside down loops that are so popular in today’s steel coasters". Sharon Wynne from the Tampa Bay Times suggested "it will likely to take two or three more trips on this coaster to appreciate all its tricks" and coaster enthusiast Jim Terry attending the soft opening had acclaimed it was the best roller coaster in Florida.

Arthur Levine of USA Today remarked that "it's more than enough to get pulses racing and senses heightened, but not so much as to cause tunnel vision, grayouts, or other unpleasant side effects". Elle Gordon of the Irish Independent likened the "weightless airtime" as a highlight of her park visit and added it was well worth a night time ride. Russell Meyer of Theme Park Insider observed the themeing of the roller coaster and its surrounding area was "excellently done" with the accommodating effects and music a "nice touch".

Awards

See also 
 2016 in amusement parks

References

External links

 Official attraction page

SeaWorld Orlando
Roller coasters in Florida
2016 establishments in Florida
Hypercoasters manufactured by Bolliger & Mabillard